Robert Kirss (born 3 September 1994) is an Estonian professional footballer who plays as a forward for I liga club Sandecja Nowy Sącz and the Estonia national team.

International career
Kirss made his senior international debut for Estonia on 11 January 2019, in a 2–1 friendly win over Finland. He scored his first international goal in a 2–0 UEFA Nations League win over San Marino.

International goals

Honours

Club
Nõmme Kalju
Meistriliiga: 2018

FCI Levadia
Meistriliiga: 2021
Estonian Cup: 2020–21
Estonian Supercup: 2022

References

External links

1994 births
Living people
Sportspeople from Pärnu
Estonian footballers
Association football forwards
Pärnu JK Vaprus players
Nõmme Kalju FC players
FCI Levadia Tallinn players
Sandecja Nowy Sącz players
Esiliiga players
Meistriliiga players
Estonia youth international footballers
Estonia under-21 international footballers
Estonia international footballers
Estonian expatriate footballers
Expatriate footballers in Poland
Estonian expatriate sportspeople in Poland
Pärnu Jalgpalliklubi players